Joel Andrew Kretz (born January 7, 1957) is an American politician of the Republican Party. He is a member of the Washington House of Representatives, representing the 7th Legislative District.

Awards 
 2014 Guardians of Small Business award. Presented by NFIB.
 2020 Guardians of Small Business. Presented by NFIB.

Personal life 
Kretz' wife is Sara Kretz. They have one child. Kretz and his family live in Wauconda, Washington.

References

1957 births
21st-century American politicians
Living people
Republican Party members of the Washington House of Representatives
People from Okanogan County, Washington